Phil Lade (7 October 1946 – 8 November 2005) was an Australian rules footballer who played with Hawthorn in the Victorian Football League (VFL) during the 1960s.

Lade, a half back, was recruited to Hawthorn from Penguin in the North West Football Union. He played 14 of a possible 18 games in the 1966 VFL season but just one in 1967. He then returned to Penguin and represented Tasmania at the 1969 Adelaide Carnival.

References

External links

1946 births
2005 deaths
Australian rules footballers from Tasmania
Hawthorn Football Club players
Penguin Football Club players